Goumois was a municipality in the district of Franches-Montagnes in the canton of Jura in Switzerland.  On 1 January 2009, the formerly independent municipalities of Goumois and Les Pommerats merged into Saignelégier.

References

External links

Former municipalities of the canton of Jura